The Cow-Tail Switch, and Other West African Stories by Harold Courlander is a collection of West African folk tales about men and animals, kings, warriors, and farmers. First published in 1947, it was a Newbery Honor recipient in 1948.

References

Further reading
 Bascom, William R. "[Reviewed Work: The Cow-Tail Switch and Other West African Stories by Harold Courlander, George Herzog, Madye Lee Chastain]". In: Western Folklore 7, no. 1 (1948): 93-94. Accessed July 22, 2021. doi:10.2307/1496722.
 Herskovits, Melville J. "[Reviewed Work: The Cow-Tail Switch and Other West African Stories by Harold Courlander, George Herzog]". In: American Anthropologist, New Series, 50, no. 3 (1948): 531-32. Accessed July 22, 2021. http://www.jstor.org/stable/664302.

1947 short story collections
American children's books
Collections of fairy tales
African fairy tales
Newbery Honor-winning works
Henry Holt and Company books
1947 children's books
Children's short story collections
American short story collections
African folklore